The prime minister of Ukraine is Ukraine's head of government presiding over the Cabinet of Ministers of Ukraine, which is the highest body of the executive branch of the Ukrainian government.

Since Ukrainian independence from the Soviet Union in 1991, there have been 16 prime ministers (19 counting acting PMs). Unlike the president of Ukraine, who is directly elected by popular vote every five years, the prime minister is appointed by the president upon the ratification of the candidate by the parliament, the Verkhovna Rada.

Denys Shmyhal is the current prime minister of Ukraine since 4 March 2020.

Originally appeared as a parliamentary republic without a head of state, in 1918 there was introduced a post of head of state in form of dictatorship. For a very short period there existed a collective head of state (Directory) which soon was phased away. During the Soviet period, a post of head of state was in a shadow of the Communist Party leader (see First Secretary of the Communist Party of Ukraine).

List of officeholders

Ukrainian People's Republic (19171918)

Ukrainian State (1918)

Exile republic

Ukrainian People's Republic (restored; 19181921)

Ukrainian Soviet Socialist Republic (19221991)

 Note: during the Soviet period a head of state in Ukraine as in any other union republic was a chair person of Central Executive Committee and after 1938 a chair person of Presidium of the Supreme Soviet (Verkhovna Rada).

Ukraine (1991–present)

Timeline

See also
List of Ukrainian rulers
President of Ukraine
List of presidents of Ukraine

Notes

 Died in office

Note: Concept of "government coalition" was reverted in 2014 by reestablishment of the 2004 constitutional amendments. Before 2004 and between 2010 and 2014, government was based on "parliamentary majority".

References

Prime ministers of Ukraine
Ukraine
National Security and Defense Council of Ukraine